Roeder is a surname of German origin. Notable people with this surname include:

Amy Roeder, American politician and actress
Bernard F. Roeder (1911–1971), Vice admiral in the United States Navy
Charles Roeder (1848–1911), German-born British antiquarian
Elke Christina Roeder (born 1966), German politician
Emy Roeder (1890–1971), German sculptor
Ernst Roeder (1862–1897), German writer and editor
Everett Minster Roeder, American child prodigy and Nazi spy
Glenn Roeder (1955–2021), English football manager
Jason Roeder, American drummer
Jorge Roeder (born 1980), Peruvian bassist and composer
Kathryn Roeder, American statistician
Klaus Roeder (born 1948), German musician and educator
Louis Roeder (1835–1915), American politician and landowner
Manfred Roeder (1929–2014), German lawyer and Neo-Nazi terrorist
Manfred Roeder (judge) (1900–1971), Nazi military judge
Mark Roeder (born 1957), Australian-British author
Ralph Roeder (1890–1969), American author
Robert Roeder, multiple people
Robert E. Roeder (1917–1944), American soldier and captain
Robert Earl Roeder (1931–1998), American historian and academic administrator
Robert G. Roeder (born 1942), American biochemist
Scott Roeder (born 1958), American convicted murderer
Shirleen Roeder, American geneticist

See also
Roder (disambiguation), surname and place name
Roleder, surname